In group theory, the trichotomy theorem divides the finite simple groups of characteristic 2 type and rank at least 3 into three classes. The three classes are groups of GF(2) type (classified  by Timmesfeld and others), groups of "standard type" for some odd prime (classified by the Gilman–Griess theorem and work by several others), and groups of uniqueness type, where  Aschbacher proved that there are no simple groups.

References

Theorems about finite groups